Matthew Robert Wiese (born September 22, 1971) is an American former professional wrestler and actor. He is best known for his tenure in WWE, where he performed on its SmackDown brand under the ring name Luther Reigns.

Professional wrestling career

World Championship Wrestling (1997–1998)
After a friend's recommendation, Wiese tried out for the Power Plant, World Championship Wrestling (WCW)'s professional wrestling school. Upon completing his training in the Power Plant, Wiese started his wrestling career as an enhancement talent in WCW in May 1997 using the ring name Horshu. To complement the name, his hair was shaved into a horseshoe pattern and he would try to work the word "shu" into his promos, which most notably spawned his catchphrase "There's no business like 'shu' business, baby!". He was also among six wrestlers who "auditioned" for an anti-New World Order faction called Piper's Family on the March 3, 1997 episode of Monday Nitro, spearheaded by "Rowdy" Roddy Piper. After being tested in 30-second impromptu match with Piper, Wiese was quickly defeated via sleeper hold after attempting to use dirty tactics to defeat Piper.

AWA Superstars of Wrestling (1999–2003)
After his stint in WCW, Wiese made his way to Ultimate Pro Wrestling (UPW) for more training. After his finishing up in UPW, Wiese debuted in AWA Superstars of Wrestling under his Horshu ring name. During his time there, he won the World Heavyweight Championship and held the title for a total of nine months. However, he was stripped of the title due to missing mandatory title defenses. Horshu left the promotion shortly afterwards. Wiese also worked in Japan for Pro Wrestling Zero1. After an interview with Vince McMahon, he received a developmental contract from World Wrestling Entertainment in June 2003. He soon signed on and was sent to wrestle in Ohio Valley Wrestling, WWE's then-developmental territory, where he competed under the ring name Inspector Max Impact.

World Wrestling Entertainment (2003–2005)

After a few non-televised matches before Raw in 2003 and 2004, Wiese was promoted to World Wrestling Entertainment's main roster in April 2004 under the name Luther Reigns, where he became the "assistant" to then-SmackDown! general manager Kurt Angle. Reigns later made his in-ring debut at The Great American Bash by defeating Charlie Haas, a former member of Kurt Angle's team, with whom Angle was feuding at the time.

In September, Reigns and Angle introduced the newly drafted Mark Jindrak as a new member of their team during their tag team match against Big Show and Eddie Guerrero. This led to a four-month feud with Big Show. Reigns and Jindrak then formed a new Team Angle with Angle as the leader. From September 2004 until mid-February 2005, Reigns and Jindrak helped Angle win most of his matches as well as dealing with his enemies. Reigns and Jindrak also began to compete for the WWE Tag Team Championship on occasion. However, the faction split in mid-February as Reigns and Jindrak went off on their own to feud with The Undertaker. On the February 17 episode of SmackDown!, Undertaker defeated Jindrak, after which Reigns smashed a television camera over Undertaker's head. On February 20, Reigns wrestled against The Undertaker at No Way Out. Jindrak was thrown out before the match started and although Reigns managed to hold his own, Undertaker ultimately won the match.

Following this, the team of Reigns and Jindrak began to have a falling-out. Reigns became upset at Jindrak for tapping out in a "Double Jeopardy" handicap match against the Undertaker on the February 24 edition of SmackDown! when Reigns refused to tag in. After the match, Reigns and Jindrak briefly argued before coming to blows and had to be pulled apart by officials. The following week on the March 3 edition of SmackDown!, Eddie Guerrero and Rey Mysterio defeated Jindrak and Reigns to retain the Tag Team Championship. After the match, Jindrak tried to help Reigns up to his feet after he was pinned, but Reigns smacked Jindrak in response. The two argued until Jindrak knocked Reigns out with a left hook. On the March 10 edition of SmackDown!, Jindrak and Reigns competed in a singles match, which ended with Jindrak pinning Reigns after a left hook, effectively ending their team. Reigns later took part in a 30-man interpromotional battle royal at WrestleMania 21 as a representative of the SmackDown! brand, but was unable to win as fellow SmackDown! superstar Booker T won the match.

After this, Reigns resumed his feud with Big Show after saying that Big Show embarrassed the SmackDown! brand at WrestleMania 21 when Show lost to Akebono in a sumo match. Reigns unsuccessfully tried to tip over a Jeep to prove he was stronger than Show, who then successfully tipped the Jeep over. Big Show subsequently defeated Reigns in a singles match on the following edition of SmackDown!.

Reigns then wrestled mainly on Velocity, winning the majority of his matches until he requested his release from the company, which was fulfilled on May 11, 2005. According to Wiese, the reason he requested his release was due to creative differences with Paul Heyman, as Heyman originally planned to have him and René Duprée moved to Raw to perform as a tag team. Wiese instead wished to form a stable with Christian and Tyson Tomko with Christian as the leader of the stable. However, Heyman repeatedly dismissed the idea and Wiese instead negotiated his release.

Late career (2005–2006)
Following his departure from WWE, Wiese attempted to become a real estate salesman, but his plans ultimately fell through. Instead, Wiese returned to wrestling under his Horshu ring name and returned to Ultimate Pro Wrestling in mid-2005 to face Tom Howard for the UPW Heavyweight Championship, but was unable to win the title. On October 13, Horshu lost to The Patriot in a match for Impact Zone Wrestling. before returning to wrestling on June 17 and defeating Sheik Hussein in an impromptu match in his debut for Scott Norton's Wild West Championship Wrestling. He returned to WWCW on September 16, where he wrestled Aaron Aguilera to a no contest after Norton interfered. Later on in the night, Horshu teamed with Heidenreich in a losing effort to Norton and Aguilera in what turned out to be Wiese's final match.

Media

Filmography
The Girl Next Door (2004) as Mule
True Legend (2009) in an uncredited role
Spring Break '83 (2010) as Horseshoe
Let's Be Cops (2014) as Pupa's Rival

Television
The Jenny Jones Show (2003) in episode "From Geek to Bad Ass Physique"
My Bare Lady (2006) in episodes "Floodlights and Catfights" and "Cattle Call" as himself
Heroes (2008) in episodes "Dying of the Light" and "Angles and Monsters" as Milosh
CSI: Crime Scene Investigation (2009) in episode "Disarmed and Dangerous" as Vinnie Mingus

Personal life
In early 2006, Wiese began working as a bodyguard, including for the AVN pornography convention in Las Vegas. He also performed tour security for touring rock bands, including Saliva.

On April 19, 2010, it was reported that Wiese had suffered a stroke in December 2009. Wiese stated that he believed his steroid use, which began during his time at Arizona State University, and the painkiller addiction he developed from wrestling were contributing factors to the cause of the stroke.

On April 10, 2015, several media outlets reported that Wiese, along with Russ McCullough and fellow WWE alumnus Ryan Sakoda, had filed a class action lawsuit against WWE, alleging, among other things, that "the WWE has known for years  ... the brutality in the ring has resulted in dementia, Alzheimer's disease and a lot more". The suit was litigated by attorney Konstantine Kyros, who has been involved in a number of other lawsuits against WWE. The lawsuit was dismissed by Judge Vanessa Lynne Bryant in March 2016.

Championships and accomplishments
AWA Superstars of Wrestling
AWA Superstars of Wrestling World Heavyweight Championship (1 time)
Pro Wrestling Illustrated
Ranked No. 80 of the best 500 singles wrestlers in the PWI 500 in 2004

References

External links 
 

1971 births
Living people
American male professional wrestlers
American male film actors
American male television actors
American people convicted of assault
American shooting survivors
Arizona State University alumni
Bodyguards
Male actors from New York City
Professional wrestlers from New York (state)
20th-century professional wrestlers
21st-century professional wrestlers
Professional wrestlers from New York City